Ayodhya Junction railway station is a railway station in the city of Ayodhya in Uttar Pradesh in India. The station is owned by Indian Railways.

Location
The station is near to Faizabad Junction railway station on Faizabad–Akbarpur railway station line.

Expansion
Since 2019, the station has been under expansion by adding double railway lines, alongside electrification of the tracks. The new design will retain the temple-like look of the existing station and adds new amenities besides increasing capacity to handle the greater passenger numbers expected due to the construction of the Ram Mandir in Ayodhya. The new construction is in two phases, with a cost of 131.97 crore for the first phase and Rs 307 crore for the second phase. The first phase will include the erection of the new station building with amenities such more washrooms, lounges, dormitories, and ticket office. Phase 1 was expected to be completed by June 2021. The second phase will develop the platforms.

Transport

By Air
 Lucknow Airport
 Ayodhya Airport is under construction.

Gallery

See also
 Lucknow–Kanpur Suburban Railway
 Rudauli railway station
 Lucknow Charbagh railway station
 Kanpur Central
 Gulab Bari
 Bahu Begum ka Maqbara

References

External links
 Ayodhya railway timetable

Railway junction stations in Uttar Pradesh
Railway stations in Faizabad district
Lucknow NR railway division
Railway stations opened in 1874
Ayodhya
Transport in Ayodhya
Buildings and structures in Ayodhya